is a private boys' junior and senior high school in Niiza, Saitama Prefecture, Japan, in the Tokyo metropolitan area. It is affiliated with Rikkyo University.

First established at Ikebukuro in 1948, Rikkyo Senior High School moved to a new campus at Niiza in 1960. The landmark school chapel designed by architect Antonin Raymond, was consecrated in 1963.

In 2000 the school was renamed Rikkyo Niiza Senior High School and on the same campus a new junior high school program was established, matching developments at Ikebukuro where Rikkyo Ikebukuro Junior and Senior High School provides a similar six year integrated high school program. The schools' current main buildings as well as St. Paul's Field and gymnasium all opened in 2014.

Since 1990, adjacent to the junior and senior high school facilities, the campus at Niiza also serves as a secondary campus for first and second year undergraduate students of Rikkyo University.

Notable alumni

Politicians
Osamu Uno
Toshio Ogawa
Ryosei Tanaka

Artists
Hiroshi Sugimoto, photographer
Oji Hiroi, video game developer
Nariaki Obukuro, singer

Athletes
Nobuhide Tachi, racing driver
Kazushige Nagashima, baseball player
Kenji Tomura, baseball player
Takayuki Takabayashi, baseball player

Performers
Hiroshi Sekiguchi, actor
Haruomi Hosono, leader of Yellow Magic Orchestra
Yukihiro Takahashi, drummer of Yellow Magic Orchestra
Motoharu Sano, musician
Taro Yamaguchi, voice actor

Presenters
Monta Mino
Ichiro Furutachi

Others
Akihiko Honda, boxing promoter

References

External links
 Rikkyo Niiza Junior and Senior High School 
 English Information

Educational institutions established in 1948
High schools in Saitama Prefecture
Schools in Saitama Prefecture
Boys' schools in Japan